Sir John Leonard Hunt (27 October 1929 – 19 September 2017) was a British Conservative Party politician.

Early life
Hunt was educated at Dulwich College and became a stockbroker.

Political career
He served as a councillor on Bromley Borough Council 1953–61, then became an alderman in 1961, joining the new London Borough of Bromley in 1964. He was Mayor of Bromley from 1963 to 1965.

He first stood for Parliament, unsuccessfully, at the 1959 general election, contesting Lewisham South, and he was also unsuccessful in the equivalent seat at the 1961 London County Council election.

Hunt was a Member of Parliament (MP) for 33 years, serving in Bromley from 1964 to 1974,  originally succeeding former Prime Minister Harold Macmillan, and in Ravensbourne from 1974 until he retired in 1997.

He died on 19 September 2017 at the age of 88.

References

The Times Guide to the House of Commons, Times Newspapers Ltd, 1992 and 1997 editions.

External links 
 

1929 births
2017 deaths
Conservative Party (UK) MPs for English constituencies
People educated at Dulwich College
British stockbrokers
Councillors in Greater London
UK MPs 1964–1966
UK MPs 1966–1970
UK MPs 1970–1974
UK MPs 1974
UK MPs 1974–1979
UK MPs 1979–1983
UK MPs 1983–1987
UK MPs 1987–1992
UK MPs 1992–1997
Politicians awarded knighthoods
Knights Bachelor